Sir Thomas Maclear (17 March 1794 – 14 July 1879) was an Irish-born South African astronomer who became Her Majesty's astronomer at the Cape of Good Hope.

Life
He was born in Newtownstewart, County Tyrone, Ireland, the eldest son of Rev James Maclear and Mary Magrath. In 1808 he was sent to England to be educated in the medical profession. After passing his examinations, in 1815 he was accepted into the Royal College of Surgeons of England. He then worked as house-surgeon in the Bedford Infirmary.

In 1823 he went into partnership with his uncle at Biggleswade, Bedfordshire. Two years later in 1825 he was married to Mary Pearse, the daughter of Theed Pearse, Clerk of the Peace for the county of Bedford.

Maclear had a keen interest in amateur astronomy, and would begin a long association with the Royal Astronomical Society, to which he would be named a Fellow. In 1833, when the post became vacant, he was named as Her Majesty's Astronomer at the Cape of Good Hope, and arrived there aboard the Tam O'Shanter with his wife and five daughters, to take up his new duties in 1834. He worked with John Herschel until 1838, performing a survey of the southern sky, and continued to perform important astronomical observations over several more decades. The Maclears and Herschels formed a close friendship, the wives drawn together by the unusual occupations of their husbands and the raising of their large families. Mary Maclear, like Margaret Herschel, was a noted beauty and intelligent, though suffering from extreme deafness.

Between 1841 and 1848, Maclear would be occupied in performing a geodetic survey for the purpose of recalculating the figure of the Earth (its dimensions and shape) via an arc measurement. He caused a beacon to be erected on top of Table Mountain which was used as a triangulation station for the checking of de Lacaille's arc measurement.

He became close friends with David Livingstone, and they shared a common interest in the exploration of Africa. He performed many other useful scientific activities, including collecting meteorological, magnetic and tide data.

In 1861 his wife died. 
Two years later he was granted a pension, but did not retire from the observatory until 1870. He lived thereafter at Grey Villa, Mowbray. 
By 1876, he had lost his sight, and he died three years later in Cape Town, South Africa. He is buried next to his wife in the grounds of the Royal Observatory, Cape of Good Hope.

Awards and honors

 Knighted in 1860 for his achievements as an astronomer.
 Lalande Prize (1866)
 Royal Medal of the Royal Society (1869), for his measurement of an arc of the meridian in the 1840s.
 The crater Maclear on the Moon is named after him; as is Maclear's Beacon on Table Mountain; the South African town, Maclear, Eastern Cape; and Cape Maclear in Malawi, so named by his friend David Livingstone.

See also
 John Maclear, his son, was an admiral in the Royal Navy, and commander of the 1873–1876  expedition
 Charles Piazzi Smyth
 Edward James Stone

Notes

References

External links

 Thomas Maclear 1794–1879 – SA History
 South African Astronomical Observatory History

1794 births
1879 deaths
Fellows of the Royal Astronomical Society
Fellows of the Royal Society
Irish astronomers
Knights Bachelor
People from Newtownstewart
Royal Medal winners
South African astronomers
Ulster Scots people
Recipients of the Lalande Prize